Richard J. Joseph was the 36th Chief Scientist of the United States Air Force from January 2018 until April 6, 2021, when he was replaced by Victoria Coleman.

Education 
Richard J. Joseph has a Bachelors of Science in Physics from Georgetown University in Washington D.C, and a Ph.D in Physics, from University of Texas, Austin.

References 

Chief Scientists of the United States Air Force
Living people
Year of birth missing (living people)
Georgetown University alumni
University of Texas alumni